The Accademia Ligustica di Belle Arti is a tertiary academy of fine arts located in Genoa, Italy. It also houses a museum (Museo dell'Accademia Ligustica di Belle Arti), which includes works of Giovanni Benedetto Castiglione, Giuseppe Abbati, Anton Raphael Mengs, Perin del Vaga, Luca Cambiaso, Bernardo Strozzi, Giovanni Battista Paggi, Sinibaldo Scorza, Domenico Fiasella, Luciano Borzone, Serafino De Tivoli, Plinio Nomellini. The academy was founded in 1751.

References

External links
 

 
Art schools in Italy
Education in Genoa
Educational institutions established in 1751
1751 establishments in Italy
Art museums and galleries in Genoa